Seth Crittenden Moffatt (August 10, 1841 – December 22, 1887) was a politician from the U.S. state of Michigan.

Moffatt was born in Battle Creek, Michigan, attended the common schools, and graduated from the law department of the University of Michigan at Ann Arbor in 1863.  He was admitted to the bar and commenced practice in Traverse City, Michigan.  He served as prosecuting attorney for Grand Traverse and Leelanau Counties for ten years.

Moffatt was also a member of the Michigan Senate (31st District) in 1871 and 1872 and a member of the constitutional commission (9th District) in 1873, then register of the United States Land Office at Traverse City 1874–1878.  He served as a member of the Michigan House of Representatives from Grand Traverse District in 1881 and 1882, and served as speaker in both terms.  He was also a delegate to the Republican National Convention in 1884.

In 1884, Moffatt was elected as a Republican from Michigan's 11th congressional district to the 49th Congress. He was re-elected in 1886 to the 50th Congress, serving from March 4, 1885, until his death at the age of forty-six in Washington, D.C.  Henry W. Seymour was elected on February 14, 1888, to fill the vacancy caused by his death.

Seth Moffatt was a resident of Northport and is interred at Oakwood Cemetery of Traverse City.

See also
List of United States Congress members who died in office (1790–1899)

References

The Political Graveyard

1841 births
1887 deaths
Republican Party Michigan state senators
Burials in Michigan
Speakers of the Michigan House of Representatives
University of Michigan Law School alumni
Republican Party members of the United States House of Representatives from Michigan
19th-century American politicians